An usu is a large Japanese stamp mill with a pestle called kine, used to pound rice or millet.

While the function of an usu is similar to the smaller suribachi and surikogi mortars, the shape is very different, as the usu usually lacks the rough pattern in the bowl, and has a differently shaped pestle which is used in a different manner.

Appearance 
The usu is usually about one meter high (including pedestal) and has a diameter of ca. 30 cm. The usu is usually made of wood or stone. The kine  is a long wooden mallet with a length exceeding one meter. The usu is usually operated by two people at the same time. One person swings the kine to pound the rice in a similar motion to chopping wood. It is physically demanding work and is usually done by men who often chant to keep time. Between each swing, another person puts his hand in the bowl to turn the rice. Timing is critical for safe operation of the usu.

Use 
The most common use of an usu is to pound cooked white rice into a very sticky mass in order to produce mochi. It is still frequently used in Japan in traditional restaurants and also sometimes in traditional, rural, or wealthier private households. Especially around New Year they are used by companies and organizations to make mochi together and distribute it to the employees to strengthen the group spirit.

See also 
 Jeolgu, Korean equivalent of usu
List of Japanese cooking utensils

Japanese food preparation utensils
Food grinding tools